This is a list of cricketers who played for the Gentlemen of Kent in first-class cricket matches. The side played 49 matches which have been granted retrospective first-class status. These include 48 played between 1830 and 1880 and one played under the same name in 1791. The side was generally made up of amateur cricketers, often those associated with Kent County Cricket Club. It played most frequently against MCC and Gentlemen of England sides and an annual first-class fixture took place during the Canterbury Cricket Week between 1842 and 1866.

The side played other matches, including an annual one-day fixture against I Zingari during Canterbury Week. This list includes only those men who played for the side in matches which have been afforded first-class status. Note that many players represented other teams besides the Gentlemen of Kent.

A

B

C

D

E
Herbert Edlmann
James Edmeades

F

G

H

I
John Inge

J

K

L
Matthias Lancaster
Bob Lipscomb
Alfred Lubbock
Edgar Lubbock
Nevile Lubbock

M

N

O
Christopher Oldfield
Charles Oxenden

P

R

S

T

W

See also
List of Kent County Cricket Club players
 List of Kent county cricketers to 1842

Notes

References

Gentlemen of Kent
Gentlemen of Kent cricketers